Mark Bradley Childress (born 1959) is the former United States Ambassador to Tanzania and former Deputy Chief of Staff for Planning in the administration of President Obama. Previously, he served in the Department of Health and Human Services and on Capitol Hill.

On July 8, 2013, President Obama announced his intent to nominate Childress to be United States Ambassador to Tanzania. On July 9, 2013, his nomination was sent to the Senate.

He received a hearing before the United States Senate Committee on Foreign Relations on September 24, 2013. He was reported out of committee on October 31, 2013, and again on January 15, 2014. He was confirmed to his ambassadorship by voice vote on April 7, 2014. He presented his credentials to President Jakaya Mrisho Kikwete on May 22, 2014.  On October 25, 2016, Childress stepped down as the U.S. ambassador to Tanzania.

References

External links

|-

1959 births
Living people
Obama administration personnel
United States Department of Health and Human Services officials
University of North Carolina School of Law alumni
White House Deputy Chiefs of Staff
Yale University alumni
Politicians from Asheville, North Carolina
Ambassadors of the United States to Tanzania